Shiro Oishi, born in 1942, is a former US National Champion in judo. In the US National championships, Oishi earned a Silver medal in 1966 and a Gold in 1969. He is also a former national wrestling champion.

Oishi moved from Tokyo to New York where in 1969 he opened a judo school. He was revolutionary in his use of co-ed training.

Oishi is currently a 7th degree black belt in judo.

References 

1942 births
American male judoka
American sportspeople of Japanese descent
Living people
Japanese emigrants to the United States